The Writers Guild of America (WGA) credit system for motion pictures and television programs covers all works under the jurisdiction of the Writers Guild of America, East (WGAE) and the Writers Guild of America, West (WGAW). The WGA, originally the Screen Writers Guild, has since 1941 been the final arbiter of who receives credit for writing a theatrical, television or new media motion picture written under its jurisdiction. Though the system has been a standard since before the WGA's inception, it has seen criticism.

A determination process for screen credits first sees the production company submit proposed credits; about a third of these are challenged and taken to arbitration. This process asks all writing parties involved to provide evidence and supporting statements to help determine how much of the final product was each writer's work. A variety of credit forms can be given, which indicate technicalities like whether a writer contributed original material, the chronological order of contributions, and if people worked on a script together. Since its inception, writers must have contributed at least 33 percent of a final script to receive credit, and only a certain number of writers can receive credit.

Background

Rationale
Writing credits affect the career of writers, as well as their reputation and union membership.

Writers trade on the reputation of their name; John Howard Lawson, the first president of the Screen Writers Guild (SWG; now the Writers Guild of America, WGA), said that "a writer's name is his most cherished possession. It is his creative personality, the symbol of the whole body of his ideas and experience." Not having their name on a film's credits will not only cost the writer residuals, but also hinder them from finding future work, depending on the film's success. A writer may also be given a bonus if their name is in the credits, as films often have many more contributing writers than the credits show.

The credit system can affect eligibility for membership in the trade union, as one way in which a person becomes a member of the Writers Guild of America, West (WGAW) is by accruing "points" based on the individual's writing credits. Membership points are also accrued through employment by, or sale or option to, a company signatory to the Minimum Basic Agreement (MBA), a deal struck between the WGA and a collection of studios and production companies every three years, in which the companies agree to certain minimum fees, residuals, and other benefits for WGA writers they contract. It is negotiated by a committee of the WGA.

Screen Writers Guild credit system
The early industry had taken efforts to prevent writers from unionizing. Although the SWG was formed in 1933, it encountered resistance until May 1941, when it signed a deal with the studios that gave the Guild, among other rights, the final say on writing credits. The agreement was seen as weak, as it mostly covered the lowest paid writers, and credits were still unfairly given in the compulsory collaboration era when studios employed large numbers of independent writers on projects; at this point, the need for writers to have contributed 33 percent of the final script had been established, which left many out of credits on productions written by committee. The best paid writers, on the other hand, had always been respected and could often elect to work alone because of their status.

Credits process
All writers on a project have the right to know who else has written on that project. Under the MBA a production is required to tell all new writers who has preceded them; a writer may conversely ask the production for the names of those who contributed after them. Writers also bear responsibilities to make sure they are informed, and to inform other writers on the same project that they are working for it; they must also file their contract with the appropriate Guild within a week of receiving it. For television productions of a motion picture over 90 minutes, the production company must inform, in writing, all writers of the writers who follow them. 

The MBA stipulates also that the production company must supply all participant writers—anyone who has contributed, or been hired to contribute, written material; anyone who has been paid for their prior written material whether purchased or licensed; anyone who contributed in any of the aforementioned ways to the original script, in the case of a remake—and the Writers Guild a notice of tentative credits, and give all participant writers a copy of either the shooting script or latest revised script, promptly upon the conclusion of photography. Any participant writer, even deceased, has the right to be involved in the credit determination process (this may be through a representative, such as an agent). Up to three writers, or two teams of writers in film and three teams of writers in television, may receive credit for a production. The Writers Guild has the right to protest any company's proposed  credits, regardless of whether the writers do.

To determine credits, "it is vital that the writer keep copies of all work done", and submit copies to the Writers Guild promptly upon completion. Scripts as well as substantial story ideas and other literary material are counted for credit decisions. When there is more than one participant writer on a production, "all participants have the right to agree unanimously among themselves as to which of them shall receive writing credits on the screen and in what form", as long as the agreed form meets requirements. The MBA also establishes that the agreed form "shall not be suggested or directed by the [production] Company".

The Writers Guild also officially presumes that any writer has access to all prior material written for the project during their employment, underscoring credits given to prior writers who have been removed from projects. Materials used for research are not credited, but source material as defined by the WGA receives credits. The appropriate credit to use for source material is anything indicative of the nature and relationship of the source material and the final script, with the WGA providing the examples "From a Play by, From a Novel by, Based upon a Story by, From a series of articles by, Based upon a [teleplay/Screenplay] by".

Once a writer has received both the notice of tentative credits and the final script, they can either agree with the production's tentative credits, in which case they do nothing, they can discuss the credits with the other writers through the Writers Guild, or they can challenge the tentative credits within a certain time period. If a participant writer disagrees with the credits, but there are other participants and it is seen that an agreement may be reached between them, the Screen/Television Credits Administrator must make a best attempt to arrange discussion between all writers before arbitration is sought.

Credit forms

Teams
Credits are handled differently for individual writers and for "teams". A team of writers is defined by the WGA as "two writers who have been assigned at about the same time to the same material and who work together for approximately the same length of time on the material"; the work of the two writers is considered a joint contribution, not creditable to only one of them or to one more than the other. For the purpose of credits (and to discourage later disputes), one of the writers must openly question the designation of their contributions being part of a team at the time the work is submitted to the Writers Guild if they wish to be credited in another way. A team is credited with an ampersand (&) separating their names. Team credits are more complex when one of the team has also been hired as an additional writer: both writers in the team must form an agreement to allow the additional writer to take the shared credit. Multiple writers who are not part of a team have the word "and" separating their names.

Written by
The "Written by" credit is for writers who can claim both the story and teleplay/screenplay elements, except when there is "source material of a story nature". There are some restrictions on producers and directors of a work being given writing credits, particularly that they cannot receive the story/screenplay/teleplay credit unless there are either no other writers for the story/screenplay/teleplay or the decision is taken to arbitration, and that the Writers Guild must have been notified of a writing team (intending to claim credits) that includes a producer/director and a non-producer/director at the commencement of the team's work together. In television, a written by credit is also usually given to writers on variety shows and audience participation shows.

Screenplay by
A "Screenplay by" credit may also be used, when the writers for the story and screenplay are different, or in similar circumstances to a screen story credit (either if the work is not mostly original, or in addition to the screen story credit). No more than two writers can share a screenplay credit except in cases of arbitration. From arbitration, screenplay credits can be given to either three individual writers or two teams of writers. For the purposes of arbitration, to be awarded a screenplay credit, the writer must have contributed more than 33 percent of the final screenplay. In the case of an original screenplay, Writers who did not write the original must contribute more than 50 percent to receive the credit. The WGA acknowledges the difficulty in determining such percentages. The television equivalent of the screenplay by credit is "Teleplay by", and it is used in the same way.

Story by
The MBA describes story as "distinct from [teleplay/screenplay] and consisting of basic narrative, idea, theme or outline indicating character development and action". A "Story by" credit is used when the writer was hired (as a WGA member) to write for story, when the story idea was purchased from the writer by a WGA signatory company, or when the resultant script is based on a sequel story devised by the writer under the WGA's jurisdiction. The "Story by" credit cannot be shared by more than two writers in film and three in television, and the story may have been written in different literary forms, including a film treatment. A "Screen Story by" or "Television Story by" credit is used for the screenwriter when their work is based on, but substantially different from, source material and a story as they are defined by the WGA. Screen story credit also cannot be shared by more than two writers, and is a credit that is only handled through arbitration. The writer of the source material for the screen story may receive a source material credit.

Separated rights
Television also has a "Created by" and a "Developed (for Television) by" credit under a crediting structure known as separated rights. Writers entitled to created by credits will have developed a significant part of the format, story, and teleplay, and also get sequel rights to the material. Created by credits are given on every episode, while Developed (for Television) by credits are only given on the episodes the writer has explicitly contributed material to.

Other forms
Other writing credits that may be used are "Narration Written by", "Based on Characters Created by", and "Adaptation by". A "Special Material by" credit can be given to writers on some forms of television shows, when they have contributed written material that does not qualify for other credits; there are no limits to how many people may receive this credit.

Screenwriter Scott Myers, a WGA member and arbiter on "perhaps 10 credit arbitrations", has questioned why more than three writers cannot be credited, saying:

Structure and exceptions
In credits, names are usually ordered by who did the most work. If the order is disagreed upon and the arbitration finds that all writers contributed equally, the names will be ordered chronologically. Before a pseudonym can be used, it must be registered with the Writers Guild.

A writer may withdraw from credit "for personal cause" before the tentative notice is submitted; if the other writers do not agree, it shall be taken to arbitration. A writer cannot withdraw from credit after arbitration. Withdrawing from credit also includes losing rights to and compensation from the material; using a pseudonym does not remove these rights.

Arbitration
If there is no agreement on writing credits, the Writers Guild's Screen Credits Administrator (for film) or Television Credits Administrator (for television) will begin arbitration proceedings. Three members of the Writers Guild are selected as arbiters, as long as they have no interest in the decision; for film, the members must have either been a member for five years or have three screen credits, and for television, they must have been a member for at least one year and have at least three writing credits. At least two of the selected members must have been on at least two arbitration committees before and, where possible, members who are familiar with the type of writing involved will be chosen. The identity of arbiters is kept anonymous to everyone, including the other arbiters, except the Screen/Television Credits Committee. Also, before selecting the three members, the Screen/Television Arbiters List of all eligible members will be sent to all participant writers, who can preclude from selection a reasonable number of names on it; the selection will be made from the remaining names without question. A member of the Screen/Television Credits Committee will be designated to each arbitration case to advise the arbiters and help them to come to a decision. Film arbitration takes place over 21 business days, and television arbitration over eight.

All participant writers and the production must also cooperate with the committees, most importantly by accurately submitting all written material (original and in triplicate) to be considered, and scrutinizing submitted material. The Writers Guild also advises all writers to submit a written statement to the arbitration committee, outlining their stance and detailing their claim to credit in line with Writers Guild policy; the statement cannot include anything irrelevant to the case, reference to compensation, letters of support from other people, or information on the development that will not help the arbiters in their purely analytical review. 

Participant writers have 24 hours to give their statements, their only means of providing supporting evidence to the arbiters, to the guild. Statements submitted late will be accepted as long as they come before a decision is made. The arbiters thus each receive the tentative writing credits, the writers' statements, a summary of the issues to be determined in the case, all the written material with a chronological record, a copy of the Screen/Television Credits Manual, and the request that their decision be communicated to the Screen/Television Credits Administrator first by telephone and then in writing.

The writers' statements are kept private by the WGA. Additionally, the writers' identities are kept anonymous from the arbiters.

In situations where there is doubt over the authenticity of the submitted written material, a hearing may be held before arbitration, where the writers each provide testimony and evidence as to the authorship, sequence, and legitimacy of the material. The Writers Guild may also request a descriptive script of a film called a "cutting continuity", or a television production called an "as broadcast" script, which the production must provide if available; particularly, a writer may ask that the Writers Guild request this if they believe the final script is not reflective of what was actually filmed.

The arbiters may not come to unanimous agreement. When this happens, they teleconference with the advisor to, while remaining anonymous to each other, discuss the reasoning for their choices in an attempt to come to a decision. In the absence of a unanimous decision at this stage, a majority decision shall be accepted. The arbitration committee's decision, once written confirmation has been received by the Screen/Television Credits Administrator, is communicated to the interested parties. A participant writer may then request an appeal before an internal Policy Review Board of the Writers Guild, within 24 hours of the arbiters' decision being communicated to them. That board consists of three members of the Screen/Television Credits Committee, usually including either the Chair or Vice-Chair; none should have an interest in the decision. The Policy Review Board only serves to determine if there was any "serious deviation from the policy of the Guild or the procedure as set forth in [the Screen/Television Credits Manual]" through the process of the arbitration, and do not read any of the submitted written materials nor judge the writers' contributions. The Policy Review Board may annul an arbitration decision, but only if policy regarding decision-making has been broken; if they find this, the arbiters may be asked to reconsider, or a new arbitration committee selected.

Should the screenplay be rewritten after the final credits decision has been made, arbitration may be reopened within 48 hours of the final changes.

WGA members have criticized how the process handles existing material, such as a book that is adapted to film. New York Times reporter Michele Willens suggests that the first writer to work on such a project will write the most cinematic elements of the story, but other teams that subsequently work on the script may base their work on the original text, rather than the first draft. Barry Levinson, the director of Wag the Dog, and a disputant over screenwriting credit for the film (which was adapted from a novel), said:

Notable conflicts
Frank Pierson, former WGAW president (and former president of the Academy of Motion Picture Arts and Sciences), said that "the large majority of credits are still straightforward and uncontested [but] when they go wrong, they go horribly wrong." Writer-director Phil Alden Robinson has said that "no one can trust the writing credit. Nobody knows who really wrote the film." From 1993 to 1997, there were 415 arbitrations, about a third of all films with credits submitted.

When Hunter S. Thompson's Fear and Loathing in Las Vegas was adapted for the screen, Alex Cox and Tod Davies wrote the initial adaptation. When Terry Gilliam was brought in to direct it, he rewrote it with Tony Grisoni. The WGA initially denied Gilliam and Grisoni any credit even though Gilliam claimed that nothing of the original adaptation remained in the final film: "As a director, I was automatically deemed a 'production executive' by the Guild and, by definition, discriminated against. But for Tony to go without any credit would be really unfair." After complaints, the WGA awarded Gilliam and Grisoni credit in addition to Cox and Davies, but Gilliam resigned from the union over the dispute. Gilliam said the arbitration process "[is] really a Star Chamber", claiming it took more work than the screenplay itself.

Similar problems arose for the film Ronin. According to director John Frankenheimer, "the credits should read: Story by J. D. Zeik, screenplay by David Mamet. We didn't shoot a line of Zeik's script." Instead, Mamet received credit under a pseudonym. After the controversy over credits for Wag the Dog, Mamet decided to attach his name only to movies on which he is the sole writer.

A disagreement over the 2–1 arbitration decision denying George Clooney a writing credit for Leatherheads led Clooney to become a financial core member of the WGA, rather than an active one. Variety's Michael Fleming wrote that "Clooney took a languishing 17-year-old project and got a greenlight after personally giving the script a major overhaul that transformed it into a screwball comedy", with Clooney asserting that he wrote almost the entire script, but only Duncan Brantley and Rick Reilly, who came up with the original concept, were credited.

See also
 Billing (filmmaking)
 Credit (creative arts)
 Motion picture credits
 WGA script registration service
 Writers Guild of America Award

Notes

References

External links
WGA Screen Credits Manual (as of June 18, 2010)
WGA Television Credits Manual (as of June 18, 2010)
WGA Television Credits Procedures Guide
WGA Credits Survival Guide
WGA West page on writing credits
WGA East page on credit determination
IMDb's page on credit determination

Screenwriting credit system
Credits system
Film production